Siccia melanospila is a moth in the family Erebidae. It was described by George Hampson in 1911. It is found in the Democratic Republic of the Congo, Kenya and South Africa.

References

Moths described in 1911
Nudariina